Yesufu is a Hausa surname common in Nigeria.

Notable Nigerians with the name 

 Aisha Yesufu, Nigerian activist
 Yesufu Lumu, Anglican bishop in Nigeria
 T. M. Yesufu, Nigerian academic

References 

Surnames of Nigerian origin